Joh or Joh. may refer to:

People 
 Juan Orlando Hernández (born 1968), former president of Honduras

Given name 
 Joh Bailey, Australian hair stylist
 Joh Bjelke-Petersen (1911–2005), Australian politician
 Joh Mizuki (1938–1991), Japanese actor
 Joh Sasaki (born 1950), Japanese writer and journalist
 Joh Shaw (born 1982), Australian snowboarder

Surname 
 Araki Joh, Japanese manga artist
 Asami Jō (born 1975), Japanese pornographic actress
 Mary Kim Joh (1904–2005), Korean-American composer
 Masako Jō (born 1978), Japanese voice actress
 Tiffany Joh (born 1986), American professional golfer

Abbreviation
 Johan (given name)
 Johannes
 John (disambiguation)

Other uses 
 Jerusalem Open House, LGBT organization
 Joh Yowza, a fictional character in the Star Wars franchise
 Johnston railway station, in Pembrokeshire, Wales
 Joint Operations Headquarters of the Sri Lankan military 
 Journal of Olympic History